Fanhunter, el juego de rol épicodecadente (Spanish: Fanhunter, the epic decadent role-playing game) is a Spanish comedy role-playing game designed by Chema Pamundi, developed by Xavi Garriga, first edited by Cels Piñol in 1992 and set in the fictional universe created by Piñol under the name of Fanhunter. The first edition of the game, from 1992, was a self-edited publication made out of 500 photocopy-printed copies. The second edition, published in November 1993, was edited by the Farsa's Wagon publishing house.

Setting

Supplements 
 X-pansion Kit, Farsa's Wagon, Barcelona, May 1994, 
 Operación Anhilite, Farsa's Wagon, Barcelona, November 1994, 
 La Guia de Barnacity, Farsa's Wagon, Barcelona, May 1994, 
 BNC Tales, Farsa's Wagon, Barcelona, May 1997, 
 Spanish Show 1ª Parte, Farsa's Wagon, Barcelona, March 2000, 
 Spanish Show 2ª Parte, Farsa's Wagon, Barcelona, July 2000, 
 Spanish Show 3ª Parte, Farsa's Wagon, Barcelona, September 2001,

Spinoffs 
 Fanpiro (2001)
 Outfan (2002)

See also 
 Fanhunter

References

External links 
 Official Fanhunter website

Comedy role-playing games
Spanish role-playing games
Role-playing games based on comics
Barcelona in fiction
Role-playing games introduced in 1992